The Nana Project is an upcoming American mockumentary comedy film directed by Robin Givens. Set at the Timeless Acres Retirement Home, the film follows a documentary crew who develop an interest in one of its star residents—feisty chess master Helen “Nana” Lewis (Mercedes Ruehl). The film stars Ruehl with Nicky Whelan, Morgan Fairchild, Tony Todd, Charlene Tilton, Beth Broderick, Margaret Avery, Sierra McCormick, Katie Sarife, Gina Hiraizumi, Nolan Gould and Will Peltz.

Cast
 Mercedes Ruehl as Helen “Nana” Lewis
 Nicky Whelan as Jennifer
 Morgan Fairchild as Francesca
 Tony Todd as Jack
 Charlene Tilton as Esther
 Beth Broderick as Kitty
 Margaret Avery as Gladys
 Sierra McCormick as Sarah
 Katie Sarife as Linda Jenkins
 Gina Hiraizumi as Lisa Chen
 Christina Moore as Cindy Trublen
 Nolan Gould as Andrew
 Will Peltz as Cody
 Mike Manning as Todd Stevens

Production
On December 21, 2021, it was reported that Mercedes Ruehl will star in the mockumentary-style comedy directed by Robin Givens.
On May 12, 2022, Nicky Whelan, Morgan Fairchild, Tony Todd, Charlene Tilton, Beth Broderick, Margaret Avery, Sierra McCormick, Katie Sarife, Gina Hiraizumi, Nolan Gould, Will Peltz, Olivia d’Abo, Eddie Steeples, and Mike Manning have joined the cast. Filming began in Louisville, Kentucky from May 18.

References

External links

Upcoming films
Upcoming English-language films
Films set in Louisville, Kentucky